Thumbcuffs are a metal restraining device that lock thumbs in proximity to each other.

Thumbcuffs were originally intended for use by detectives, narcotics officers and off-duty policemen, their size allowing them to be carried in the pocket. Most are rigid devices, while some used in Asian countries are chain-linked, like miniature handcuffs.

Thumbcuffs are rarely used due to an increased possibility of injury, most commonly by tight cuffs blocking blood circulation.  Handcuffs are usually used instead.

Thumbcuffs may also be used as improvised toecuffs by locking the big toes in proximity to each other.

Thumbcuffs with double locks have a lockspring which, when engaged, usually using the top of the key, stops the thumbcuff from ratcheting tighter and prevents the subject from tightening them, possibly causing injury. Double locks also make picking the locks more difficult.

See also
 BDSM
 Bondage cuffs
 Chinese finger trap
 Handcuffs
 Legcuffs

Physical restraint